Revolutionary Vol. 1 is the debut album by rapper Immortal Technique, released on September 18, 2001, and re-pressed in 2004 (by Babygrande Records). The first edition had no distribution and no bar code; it was sold by the artist on the streets and at his shows. The album re-press was manufactured with a bar code and is being distributed worldwide by Viper Records and Babygrande Records.  Immortal Technique said in 2009 that the album had sold more than 45,000 copies.

Reception

Stewart Mason of AllMusic gave the album a score of three-and-a-half stars out of five. He praised Immortal Technique for being able to fit complicated political themes convincingly to music. Mason wrote that listeners may not approve of the production quality, but noted that it had a "rough-edged charm" to it.

Writing on RapReviews in November 2005, Steve 'Flash' Juon responded positively to the album, calling Immortal Technique "a smooth flowing, rough hewn vocalist with an excellent sense of timing and breath control" and judging the production as "good to outstanding".

Track listing

Samples 

"Creation & Destruction" samples the song "The Letter" from the album Green Is Blues by Al Green.
 "Positive Balance" samples "Ice Dance" from the movie soundtrack for Edward Scissorhands by Danny Elfman and "Hypnotize" by The Notorious B.I.G.
 "No Me Importa" samples the song "Comin' Home Baby" by Herbie Mann.
 "Dance with the Devil" samples "Survival of the Fittest" by Mobb Deep, "Love Story" by Francis Lai, and "Think (About It)" by Lyn Collins; The hidden track version with Diabolic also contains a sample of "Sonata for Viola and Harpsichord - 1st Mvt" by Johann Sebastian Bach.
 "No Mercy" samples The Ballot or the Bullet" by Malcolm X and "Yuri Escapes" by Maurice Jarre.
 "The Illest" samples "Change the Beat (Female Version)" by Beside and "Swan Lake Suite (Op.20)" by Pyotr Ilyich Tchaikovsky

References

External links
Viper Records official website

Immortal Technique albums
2001 debut albums
Babygrande Records albums
Horrorcore albums